John Warne is an American musician who has been active since 1996. He is best known for being the bassist for the Christian rock band Relient K as well as being a founding member of the Christian punk band Ace Troubleshooter. His hometown is Minneapolis, Minnesota and lives in Golden, Colorado.

Bands

Relient K

Warne originally started filling in as a bassist for Relient K in September 2004, after the then bassist Brian Pittman left the band less than a month earlier. Warne joined Relient K as the full-time bassist and backing vocalist in February 2005. He has contributed to four Relient K projects, and on four full-length albums, Five Score and Seven Years Ago, Forget and Not Slow Down, Is for Karaoke, and Collapsible Lung. He also provided back-up vocals for two songs on Relient K's 2004 album Mmhmm. Warne also animated the band's flash cartoon, Woodland Forest.

Ace Troubleshooter
Warne was a founding member of the now defunct Christian punk band Ace Troubleshooter, in which he played guitar and sang lead vocals. The band was active from 1996 to 2004, recording five full-length albums, the first two independently released and the last three released under the record label Tooth & Nail Records or its affiliate BEC Recordings.

Guerilla Rodeo
In 2004 Warne participated in the short-lived band Guerilla Rodeo, playing bass. The band's only record was a three-track EP.

Discography

 With Ace Troubleshooter
 Back in the Shootin' Match (1996) — lead vocals and guitar
 Don't Stop a Rockin''' (1999) — lead vocals and guitar
 Ace Troubleshooter (album) (2000) — lead vocals and guitar
 The Madness of the Crowds (2002) — lead vocals and guitar
 It's Never Enough (2004) — lead vocals and guitar

 With Guerilla Rodeo
 Ride, Rope and Destroy (2004) — bass guitar and backing vocals

 With Relient K
 Mmhmm (2004) — guest vocals on "More Than Useless" and "Who I Am Hates Who I've Been"
 Apathetic EP (2005) — bass guitar and backing vocals
 Five Score and Seven Years Ago (2007) — bass guitar and backing vocals
 The Bird and the Bee Sides (2008) — bass guitar and backing vocals, wrote and sang "The Last, the Lost, the Least"
 Forget and Not Slow Down (2009) — bass guitar and backing vocals
 Is for Karaoke (2011) — bass guitar and backing vocals
 Collapsible Lung'' (2013) — bass guitar and backing vocals

References

1979 births
Living people
American performers of Christian music
Musicians from Minneapolis
Relient K members
American rock bass guitarists
American male bass guitarists
Guitarists from Minnesota
American male guitarists
21st-century American bass guitarists